Jackson Sun may refer to:

 Jackson Sun (linguist), a Taiwanese linguist
 The Jackson Sun, an American newspaper